Vox populi (lit. 'voice of the people') is an interview with members of the public in broadcasting.

Vox populi may also refer to:

Film and television
Vox populi (film), a 2008 Dutch film
Vox Populi (TV series), an Australian current-affairs program 1986–1995
"Vox Populi" (Jericho), a television episode
"Vox Populi", an episode of The Equalizer (2021 TV series)#Season 2 (2021–22)

Music
 Vox populi sound system, a group of DJs etc. based in London
 "Vox Populi", a song by 30 Seconds to Mars from This Is War
 "Vox Populi", a song by Sepultura from Nation

Other uses
 Vox Populi (art gallery), in Philadelphia, U.S.
 Vox Populi, a 1620 tract against the Spanish Match, by Thomas Scott
 Vox Populi, a review website by Edgeworks Entertainment
 "Vox populi", the slogan of radio station WVOX
 Vox Populi, a fictional movement in the video game BioShock Infinite

See also 
 Vox pop (disambiguation)
 Vox humana (disambiguation)
 Voice of the people (disambiguation)
 Vox populi, vox Dei, ('the voice of the people is the voice of God')
Vox Populi, Vox Dei, a Whig tract of 1709